R v Lavallee, [1990] 1 S.C.R. 852 is a leading Supreme Court of Canada case on the legal recognition of battered woman syndrome. The judgment, written by Justice Bertha Wilson, is generally considered one of her most famous. The court held in favour of allowing battered woman syndrome to explain how the mental conditions for self-defence were present in this case, and Lavallee's acquittal was restored.

Background
Angelique Lynn Lavallee was in an abusive common law relationship with Kevin Rust. During a particularly serious fight Rust threatened to harm her, saying "either you kill me or I'll get you". During the altercation Rust slapped her, pushed her and hit her twice on the head. At some point during the altercation he handed Lavallee a gun, which she first fired through a window screen. Lavallee first contemplated shooting herself, however when Rust turned around to leave the room she shot him in the back of the head. At trial, Lavallee argued self-defence, and had a psychiatrist testify in her support.  He explained the effects of her circumstances on her mental state and that in the state she was in she felt she was going to be killed and had no alternative but to shoot him. Lavallee did not testify. The jury acquitted Lavallee, the verdict was overturned on appeal, and finally the original verdict was upheld by the Supreme Court of Canada.

At issue before the Supreme Court was whether the expert evidence on the so-called "battered woman syndrome" was admissible.

Reasons of the court
Justice Bertha Wilson, writing for the court, held that expert evidence is often needed when stereotypes and myths are inherent in a layperson's reasoning. In particular here, the woman's experience and perspective is relevant to inform the reasonable person's standard required for self-defence.

See also
 R v Malott, [1998] 1 S.C.R. 123

External links
 
 Martha Shaffer, "The Battered Woman Syndrome Revisited: Some Complicating Thoughts Five Years after R. v. Lavallee" (1997) 47 University of Toronto Law Journal 1

Supreme Court of Canada cases
1990 in Canadian case law
Canadian criminal case law
Canadian evidence case law